Kajewskiella is a genus of plants in the family Rubiaceae.

At present (May 2014), there are only two known species, both endemic to the Solomon Islands:

Kajewskiella polyantha M.E.Jansen
Kajewskiella trichantha Merr. & L.M.Perry

References

Rubiaceae genera
Dialypetalantheae
Flora of the Solomon Islands (archipelago)